Echeveria lilacina, common name ghost echeveria or Mexican hens and chicks, is a species of succulent plants in the genus Echeveria belonging to the family Crassulaceae.

Description

Echeveria lilacina can reach a height of about 15 cm. The leaves are silvery-grey, spoon shaped, fleshy and arranged in a symmetrical rosette of 12–25 cm of diameter. This species is slow growing and drought-tolerant. Flowers are pale pink or coral-colored. They emerge on small short arching racemes on the top of reddish stems of about 15 cm. Flowering period extends from later winter to early spring.

Distribution
This species is native to Nuevo Leon, in northern Mexico.

Habitat
Echeveria lilacina grows on rocky areas at quite high elevations.

Cultivation
Echeveria lilacina is cultivated as an ornamental plant, for use in gardens, and as a potted plant.

Etymology
The genus name Echeveria was given in honor of the 18th century Mexican botanist and painter Atanasio Echeverría y Godoy, famous for his paintings of plants, many of which were included in Flora Mexicana.

lilacina means 'lilac-colored'.

References

 Biolib
 Cactuspedia.info

External links
 

Endemic flora of Mexico
Garden plants of North America
Drought-tolerant plants
Taxa named by Reid Venable Moran
lilacina